Establishment of sister chromatid cohesion N-acetyltransferase 1 is a protein that in humans is encoded by the ESCO1 gene.

Function

ESCO1 belongs to a conserved family of acetyltransferases involved in sister chromatid cohesion.

References

External links 
 PDBe-KB provides an overview of all the structure information available in the PDB for Human N-acetyltransferase ESCO1